Barnsley East and Mexborough was a Parliamentary constituency in South Yorkshire which returned one Member of Parliament (MP) to the House of Commons of the Parliament of the United Kingdom.

The constituency was created  in 1997, partially replacing Barnsley East, and was a safe seat for the Labour Party. At the 2010 general election, it was largely replaced by a re-established Barnsley East constituency.

History

Boundaries
The Metropolitan Borough of Barnsley wards of Brierley, Darfield, Dearne South, Dearne Thurnscoe, Wombwell North, and Wombwell South, and the Metropolitan Borough of Doncaster wards of Mexborough and Richmond.

Barnsley East and Mexborough constituency covered the eastern part of the Metropolitan Borough of Barnsley and included the town of Mexborough (in the borough of Doncaster). It bordered the constituencies of Barnsley Central, Barnsley West and Penistone, Wentworth, Don Valley, Doncaster Central, Doncaster North, Selby, and Hemsworth.

Boundary review
Following their review of parliamentary representation in South Yorkshire, the Boundary Commission for England has split the existing Barnsley East seat from Mexborough, to create a smaller modified Barnsley East constituency.

This means the 2005 election was the last for the Barnsley East and Mexborough constituency. The electoral wards used in the formation of the new East division are:

Cudworth, Darfield, Hoyland Milton, North East, Rockingham, Stairfoot, Wombwell and Worsbrough.

The new Wentworth and Dearne seat includes the wards of Dearne North and Dearne South.  This area includes Bolton-on-Dearne, Goldthorpe and Thurnscoe.

Members of Parliament
The constituency had one Member of Parliament since its creation in 1997, from the Labour Party.

Elections

Elections in the 2000s

Elections in the 1990s

See also
List of parliamentary constituencies in South Yorkshire

Notes and references

Sources
BBC Election 2005
BBC Vote 2001
Guardian Unlimited Politics (Election results from 1992 to the present)
Richard Kimber's Political Science Resources (1983 and 1987 results)

Constituencies of the Parliament of the United Kingdom established in 1997
Constituencies of the Parliament of the United Kingdom disestablished in 2010
Politics of Barnsley
Mexborough
Parliamentary constituencies in Yorkshire and the Humber (historic)